Jasper Sitwell is a fictional character, an espionage agent appearing in American comic books published by Marvel Comics.

The character was portrayed by Maximiliano Hernández in the Marvel Cinematic Universe.

Publication history
Created by writer-editor Stan Lee and artist and co-plotter Jack Kirby, he first appeared in Strange Tales #144 (May 1966).

Jasper Sitwell appears as an agent of the fictional espionage agency S.H.I.E.L.D., beginning in the feature "Nick Fury, Agent of S.H.I.E.L.D." in Marvel Comics' Strange Tales #144 (cover-dated May 1966) and continuing into the subsequent Nick Fury, Agent of S.H.I.E.L.D. comic-book series in 1968. He became the S.H.I.E.L.D. liaison to defense industry contractor Tony Stark beginning in the "Iron Man" feature in Tales of Suspense #93 (September 1967), and continuing into that subsequent series as well. He was seldom featured from the early 1970s until the 1988 miniseries Nick Fury vs. S.H.I.E.L.D., and then again in the 1996–1997 series Iron Man (vol. 2). Sitwell afterward appeared in a three-issue arc of the superhero-team series The Avengers in 2000, and in Punisher War Journal (vol. 2) #1 (January 2007).

Fictional character biography
Jasper Sitwell graduated at the top of his class at S.H.I.E.L.D. Academy, with particularly high marks in airborne jump school and underwater maneuvers. When first introduced to S.H.I.E.L.D. Executive Director Nick Fury, the new agent's eager-beaver attitude meets initially with mock (and occasionally real) frustration from Fury and second-in-command Dum Dum Dugan, but Sitwell soon proves himself and earns his fellow agents' respect — albeit tinged with occasional humor aimed at his youthfulness and idealistic naïveté. Mentored by Fury himself and occasionally appointed interim director when Fury is on solo missions in the field, Sitwell later is assigned to Stark Industries as liaison between S.H.I.E.L.D. and that defense-industry contractor, which designs and manufactures much of S.H.I.E.L.D.'s ordnance and equipment. There he confronts costumed assassins and terrorists such as Grey Gargoyle, Spymaster (who shoots him and puts Sitwell in a coma for a time), and A.I.M., and even romances Whitney Frost, a one-time Stark paramour. Sitwell is eventually reassigned back to S.H.I.E.L.D., but continues to play a role in the affairs of Tony Stark from time to time. When Obadiah Stane takes over what was by then named Stark International, Fury sends Sitwell on an ultimately failed attempt to retrieve the Iron Man armors.

Sitwell, like most of the S.H.I.E.L.D. leadership at the time, is seemingly killed by a self-aware, renegade "Deltan" variety of S.H.I.E.L.D.'s artificial human "Life Model Decoys", and replaced by one such LMD, which was then installed as executive director. The real Sitwell later turns up alive after having been brainwashed by a faction of the terrorist organization HYDRA, placed in suspended animation, released as part of a plot against Fury, and eventually deprogrammed. He has since become S.H.I.E.L.D.'s top interrogator, often paired with fellow agent Jimmy Woo. He has also worked closely with G. W. Bridge, mainly in an attempt to neutralize the threat of the Punisher.

Sitwell was one of the many S.H.I.E.L.D. agents who refused to join Norman Osborn's H.A.M.M.E.R. organization in the wake of the Skrull Secret Invasion. He would join with Dum Dum Dugan to form a mercenary paramilitary group that would engage H.A.M.M.E.R., HYDRA and its associate "Leviathan" program, alongside Nick Fury's Secret Warriors. One of these many skirmishes sees Jasper lose his friends Eric Koenig and Gabriel Jones.

He also works with Nick Fury in regards to the underground activities of Bucky Barnes, the Winter Soldier.

During one of the Winter Soldier's missions, a brainwashed Black Widow is brought into custody at S.H.I.E.L.D. headquarters. She had been influenced by old Russian brainwashing technology so it seemed she had broken free of one brainwashing attempt and had returned to her old self. This was actually a ruse by rogue Russian elements in order to strike at Nick Fury. Black Widow tried to kill Nick Fury but Sitwell got on the trajectory of the shot and was killed instead of Fury. His sacrifice gave Fury the opportunity to save himself.

He returned as a zombie through unknown ways and was held in Area 13 by a S.H.I.E.L.D. division called S.T.A.K.E. Sitwell joined the Life Model Decoy of Dum Dum Dugan and Agent Martin Reyna to fight Teen Abomination. After the defeat of Teen Abomination, Jasper was brought back to his cell. On the way back to his cell, he crossed Dugan and recognized him.

As part of the All-New, All-Different Marvel event, Jasper Sitwell's zombie form appears as a member of S.T.A.K.E.'s Howling Commandos.

Jasper Sitwell's zombie form was seen with the Howling Commandos at the time when they help Old Man Logan rescue Jubilee from Dracula.

Powers and abilities
Jasper Sitwell has S.H.I.E.L.D. training in espionage, firearms, and hand-to-hand combat.

Other versions
The Ultimate Marvel version of Jasper Sitwell is a government operative. In Ultimate Fallout, he informs Nick Fury that S.H.I.E.L.D.'s budget will be decreasing by 30 percent.

In other media

Television
Jasper Sitwell appears in The Avengers: Earth's Mightiest Heroes, voiced by Tom Kane.

Film
Jasper Sitwell's zombie form appears in Hulk: Where Monsters Dwell, voiced by Mike Vaughn. This version is a member of the Howling Commandos.

Marvel Cinematic Universe

Jasper Sitwell appears in media set in the Marvel Cinematic Universe, portrayed by Maximiliano Hernández. This version is a bald Hispanic Hydra sleeper agent who works undercover as a S.H.I.E.L.D. agent.
 Sitwell is introduced in the film Thor (2011), wherein S.H.I.E.L.D. discovers Mjolnir, establishes a base around it, and confiscates Jane Foster and Erik Selvig's research on the wormhole that brought it to Earth. They would also have encounters with Thor and the Destroyer as well.
 Sitwell appears in the Marvel One-Shot short film The Consultant (2011). He meets with fellow S.H.I.E.L.D. agent Phil Coulson to discuss the issue of the World Security Council wanting Emil Blonsky to be a part of the Avengers Initiative. They send the eponymous "Consultant", Tony Stark, to annoy General Thaddeus Ross into never releasing Blonsky from his custody.
 Sitwell makes a brief appearance in the film The Avengers (2012). 
 Sitwell appears in the Marvel One-Shot Item 47 (2012). He is assigned to track down two civilians using a Chitauri gun to rob banks. After he eventually captures them however, he decides to induct them into S.H.I.E.L.D.
 Sitwell appears in the television series Agents of S.H.I.E.L.D., with Adam Faison portraying a younger version in a flashback. While he makes minor appearances in season one, the season five episode "Rise and Shine" reveals he once attended a Hydra academy in his youth.
 In the film Captain America: The Winter Soldier (2014), Sitwell's affiliation with Hydra is revealed. Upon discovering this, Steve Rogers, Natasha Romanoff, and Sam Wilson capture and interrogate him, however in the course of the story he is killed by the Winter Soldier.
 An alternate timeline version of Sitwell appears in the film Avengers: Endgame (2019).

Video games
 Jasper Sitwell appears in Marvel: Avengers Alliance.
 Jasper Sitwell appears in Lego Marvel's Avengers, voiced by Keith Silverstein.
 Jasper Sitwell's zombie form appears in Marvel Avengers Academy, voiced by Jesse Adam.

See also
 List of S.H.I.E.L.D. members

References

External links
The Grand Comics Database
The Unofficial Handbook of Marvel Comics Creators
Iron Man Armory: Jasper Sitwell

Characters created by Jack Kirby
Characters created by Stan Lee
Comics characters introduced in 1966
Fictional secret agents and spies
Fictional special forces personnel
Fictional zombies and revenants
Male characters in film
Male characters in television
Marvel Comics male characters
Marvel Comics martial artists
Marvel Comics television characters
S.H.I.E.L.D. agents
Zombies in comics